William Unek ( – 21 February 1957) was a Belgian Congo police constable, mass murderer, spree killer, and serial killer who killed a total of 57 people in two separate spree killings three years apart.

Murder sprees
His first murder spree occurred near Mahagi, Belgian Congo in 1954, where he killed 21 people with an axe within an hour and a half, before escaping and finally ending up in British Tanganyika Territory.

Apparently because of social misunderstandings with his boss, Unek went on a second rampage which began in the early hours of February 11, 1957.

Within twelve hours, Unek shot dead ten men, eight women, and eight children, murdered five more men with the axe, stabbed another one, burned two women and a child, and strangled a 15-year-old girl, thus killing a total of 36 people. He then changed out of his police uniform into clothes stolen from one of his victims and fled. Among the dead was reportedly his own wife, whom he killed in their hut before setting it on fire, as well as the wife of a police sergeant.

Manhunt and death
For nine days, Unek was sought by Wasukuma tribesmen, police, and eventually a company of the King's African Rifles in Tanganyika's greatest manhunt up to that time.

When Iyumbu reported the incident to police, he was asked to keep Unek with him and notify them, should the killer come again to his home. Unek, still armed, reappeared at about 1:00 a.m. the next day. Iyumbu, sending his wife to police, gave Unek food and engaged in a conversation with him for nearly two hours until help arrived. At that point, Iyumbu ran out of his house whereupon a Police Superintendent threw a smoke bomb, setting the house on fire. Unek, severely injured when attempting to evade capture, later succumbed to his wounds in hospital. Iyumbu later received a financial reward of £125, as well as the British Empire Medal for his bravery leading to the capture of the constable.

Aftermath
As response to the murders, a fund was created to help the descendants of those killed and a maternity clinic was built as a memorial for Unek's victims.

His rampage ranks among the deadliest of the twentieth century.

See also
 List of rampage killers in Africa

References

External links
 Hunt crazed killer of 36, The Windsor Daily Star (February 16, 1957)
 Other parts – Dar Es Salaam, The Calgary Herald (February 19, 1957)
 Said greatest murderer in criminal history, Saskatoon Star-Phoenix (March 28, 1957)
 Mordender Polizist, Hamburger Abendblatt (March 28, 1957)       
 Public Order, Colonial, Issues 339-342 (1958)                               
 Council Debates: Official Report (1957) 
Report by His Majesty's Government in the United Kingdom of Great Britain and Northern Ireland to the General Assembly of the United Nations on the Administration of Tanganyika (1957)

1929 births
1954 in the Belgian Congo
1954 murders in Africa
1957 deaths
1957 in Tanganyika
1957 murders in Africa
Belgian Congo people
Crime in the Democratic Republic of the Congo
Death in Tanzania
Democratic Republic of the Congo police officers
Democratic Republic of the Congo spree killers
Male serial killers
Mass stabbings
Murder in Tanzania
Mass murder in Africa
Massacres in Africa
Massacres in 1954
Massacres in 1957
Mass murder in 1954
Mass murder in 1957
Serial mass murderers